This is a list of suburbs in the city of Canberra, in the Australian Capital Territory, Australia.

Suburbs are listed according to the districts in which they are located. Town centres, Group Centres, or suburbs containing group centres, appear in bold. (Some group centres or town centres have names differing from those of the suburbs in which they are located, in which case there may be a separate article listed beside the suburbs.) The date of gazettal of the suburb is appended to its entry.

For a description of Canberra's suburbs and urban hierarchy, including districts, town centres and suburbs, see Suburbs of Canberra

Belconnen
 ^ denotes suburbs which have been planned, but not yet been opened or settled

Aranda 1967
Belconnen – Belconnen Town Centre – Emu Ridge 1983
Bruce 1968
Charnwood 1973
Cook 1968
Dunlop
Evatt 1972
Florey 1975
Flynn 1971
Fraser 1974
Giralang 1974
Hawker 1972
Higgins 1968
Holt – Kippax Centre 1970
Kaleen 1974
Latham 1971
Lawson 2015
Macgregor 1971
Macnamara 2016
Macquarie – Jamison Centre 1967
McKellar 1974
Melba 1972
Page 1968
Scullin 1968
Spence 1972
Strathnairn ^
Weetangera 1968

Canberra Central
Acton 1928
Ainslie 1928
Barton 1922
Braddon 1928
Campbell – Duntroon 1928
Capital Hill 1913
City (also referred to as Civic) 1928
Deakin 1928
Dickson – Dickson Centre 1928
Downer 1960
Forrest 1928
Fyshwick 1918
Griffith – Manuka 1927
Hackett 1960
Kingston – The Causeway
Lyneham – North Lyneham  1928
Narrabundah 1947
O'Connor 1928
Parkes 1922
Red Hill 1928
Reid 1928
Russell
Turner 1928
Watson 1960
Yarralumla 1928

Gungahlin
 ^ denotes suburbs which have been planned, but not yet been opened or settled

Amaroo 1991
Bonner ~2005
Casey 2010
Crace 2009
Forde 2006
Franklin 2007
Gungahlin – Gungahlin Town Centre 1998
Harrison 2006
Jacka 2013
Kenny ^
Kinlyside ^
Mitchell
Moncrieff ~2005
Ngunnawal 1991
Nicholls 1994
Palmerston 1991
Taylor 2017
Throsby 2005

Jerrabomberra
Beard 
Hume
Oaks Estate 1984
Symonston

Majura
Canberra Airport
Pialligo 1982

Molonglo Valley
Planned suburbs as of 18 June 2012
 ^ denotes suburbs which have been planned, but not yet been opened or settled

Denman Prospect 
Coombs
Molonglo ^
Sulman ^
Whitlam ^
Wright

Tuggeranong
Banks 1987
Bonython 1986
Calwell 1975
Chisholm 1975
Conder 
Fadden 1975
Gilmore 1975
Gordon 1987
Gowrie
Greenway – Tuggeranong Town Centre 1986
Isabella Plains 1975
Kambah – Kambah Village Centre 1974
Macarthur 1982
Monash 1975
Oxley 1982
Richardson 1975
Theodore 1975
Wanniassa – Erindale Centre 1974

Weston Creek
Chapman
Duffy 1970
Fisher
Holder 1970
Rivett
Stirling 1970
Waramanga
Weston – Weston Creek Centre

Woden Valley
Chifley
Curtin – Curtin Centre 1962
Farrer
Garran 1966
Hughes 1962
Isaacs 1966
Lyons
Mawson – Southlands Centre 1966
O'Malley 1973
Pearce
Phillip – Woden Town Centre – Swinger Hill 1966
Torrens 1966

Former suburbs
In 1927 the provisional suburbs of Canberra were renamed to honour the leaders of Federation, and to retain the earlier names in the district; with the exception of Mugga (the proposed renaming of Red Hill) the new names were gazetted in 1928.
Ainslie was renamed Braddon
South Ainslie was renamed Reid
North Ainslie was renamed Ainslie
Blandfordia was renamed Forrest
Causeway became part of Kingston
Eastlake was renamed Kingston
Manuka and South Blandfordia were combined and renamed Griffith
Telopea Park was renamed Barton
Westridge was renamed Yarralumla

Other
Hall, District of Hall (technically a separate town)
Harman, District of Jerrabomberra (navy base)
Pierces Creek (former forestry settlement)
Tharwa, District of Paddys River (technically a separate town)
Uriarra (former forestry settlement)
Williamsdale, small town in the district of Tuggeranong

References

External links

 ACT Planning and Land Authority  Official website

Canberra
Suburbs
Suburbs